Brisbane is the capital city of Queensland, Australia.

Brisbane may also refer to:

Places 
Brisbane, California, United States
Brisbane, North Dakota, United States

Water craft
HMAS Brisbane (1915) a Town-class light cruiser launched in 1915 and decommissioned in 1935
HMAS Brisbane (D 41), a Perth-class guided missile destroyer launched in 1966 and decommissioned in 2001
HMAS Brisbane (DDG 41), a Hobart-class air warfare destroyer commissioned in 2018
SS Brisbane (1874)
Lady Brisbane, cruise ship

People
Brisbane (surname)

Other uses 
 Brisbane (lunar crater)
 Electoral district of Brisbane (disambiguation)
 HMAS Brisbane (naval base), a naval base operated in Brisbane between 1940 and 1942
 Brisbane, a book by Matthew Condon
 Brisbane, a variant of the Athlon 64 X2 CPU core

See also
City of Brisbane, local government area
Brisbane central business district, of Brisbane, Queensland
Brisbane Ranges National Park, in Victoria
Brisbane Water National Park, in New South Wales
Brisbane County, New South Wales, Australia